Proposition Player was a six-issue American comic book limited series created by writer Bill Willingham and artist Paul Guinan, published by the American comic book label Vertigo imprint of DC Comics.

Plot
Proposition Player tells the story of Joey Martin, a Las Vegas proposition player employed by casinos to join dull card games in order to liven up the gaming. Years of experience have made Joey an expert, if unsatisfied, card player.

One night, during a round of drinks, he is pushed into a proposition that sees him buy the souls of thirty-two people for the price of one free beer each. It is not long before those who sold their souls are suffering fatal accidents one by one, and the forces of Heaven and Hell show up trying to put a price on the purchased souls for themselves.

References
 Proposition Player @ comicbookdb

Vertigo Comics limited series
1999 comics debuts